Poo Vaasam is a 1999 Indian Tamil-language drama film, directed by Sreebharathi and produced by RVR. The film stars Murali, Ramya and Jaishankar, while Radharavi and Vinu Chakravarthy portrayed supporting roles. The music for the film was composed by Ganesh and the film had a delayed release on 19 March 1999. This was the last movie for veteran actor Jaishankar before his demise

Cast
Murali
Ramya
Jaishankar
Vinu Chakravarthy
Radharavi
Pushpalatha
Sridivya
RVR
Loose Mohan
Thavakkalai
Usailamani
Kumarimuthu

Soundtrack

Production
The film marked the only production of producer RVR, the father of actor-producer R. K. Suresh. Delays during production meant that the film was only release several years after the project was launched.

References

1999 films
1990s Tamil-language films
Indian drama films